Kyaw Kyaw Min is a Burmese politician who currently serves as a minister of Security and Border Affairs for the Mandalay Region. He also served as a member of Pyithu Hluttaw. He is also a member of Mandalay Region Administration Council from 12 February 2021 to 1 August 2021.

Political career
He is a colonel in the Burmese military. He was elected as a Pyithu Hluttaw MP elected representative from the military at the 2015 Myanmar general election.

He is one of the ministers of the Mandalay Region Government. He serves as a minister of Security and Border Affairs for the Mandalay Region.

References

1966 births
Living people